The IOOF Building is a historic building at 674 Main Street in Worcester, Massachusetts.

History 
The four-story brick Beaux Arts style building was designed by Clellan W. Fisher and was constructed in 1906 for the local chapter of the International Order of Odd Fellows.

The building was added to the National Register of Historic Places in 1980.

Construction 
The building is primarily brick, laid in Flemish bond, with dressed limestone trim. Prominent on the front facade is the main entry, an elaborate limestone archway which occupies the center of three bays. On the second floor, the side bays are highlighted by balconies that retain their original wrought iron railings. The third floor windows are large with rounded arch tops, while all three of the fourth floor windows have limestone balconies with wrought iron rails.

See also
Odd Fellows' Home (Worcester, Massachusetts)
National Register of Historic Places listings in southwestern Worcester, Massachusetts
National Register of Historic Places listings in Worcester County, Massachusetts

References

Clubhouses on the National Register of Historic Places in Massachusetts
Beaux-Arts architecture in Massachusetts
Buildings and structures completed in 1906
Buildings and structures in Worcester, Massachusetts
Odd Fellows buildings in Massachusetts
National Register of Historic Places in Worcester, Massachusetts
1906 establishments in Massachusetts